Neil Gallagher may refer to:

 Neil Gallagher (Donegal footballer) (born 1982/3), All-Ireland winner and captain of the 2007 National Football League champions
 Neil Gallagher (Louth footballer) (born 1985), Irish sportsman
 Cornelius Gallagher (American politician) (1921–2018), known as Neil, New Jersey congressman (1959–1973)

See also
 Gallagher (disambiguation)